Minnesota State Highway 80 (MN 80) is a two-lane  highway in southeast Minnesota that runs from its intersection with State Highway 16 near Wykoff and continues east to its eastern terminus at its intersection with U.S. Highway 52 at Fountain.

Route description
State Highway 80 serves as an east–west route in southeast Minnesota between Wykoff and Fountain. The route is located near the cities of Spring Valley and Preston.

The roadway passes through the Richard J. Dorer State Forest.

Highway 80 is also known as Gold Street and Front Street in Wykoff.

Legally, it is part of Constitutional Route 9 as defined in the Minnesota Statutes. However, it is not marked with this number.

History
Highway 80 was established in 1949. The route was previously U.S. 16 until that designation was moved to a bypass of Wykoff and Fountain.

The route was paved (as U.S. 16) in 1940.

Major intersections

References 

080
Minnesota
Transportation in Fillmore County, Minnesota